Carolin Schnarre (born 22 July 1992) is a German Paralympic equestrian.

Schnarre has a visual impairment. She won a silver medal at the 2016 Paralympic Games in the team event alongside Alina Rosenberg, Elke Philipp and Steffen Zeibig.

References

External links
 
 
 

1992 births
Living people
German dressage riders
German female equestrians
Paralympic equestrians of Germany
Paralympic silver medalists for Germany
Paralympic medalists in equestrian
Equestrians at the 2016 Summer Paralympics
Medalists at the 2016 Summer Paralympics
Sportspeople with a vision impairment
Sportspeople from Osnabrück